Mission Bend is a census-designated place (CDP) around Texas State Highway 6 within the extraterritorial jurisdiction of Houston in Fort Bend and Harris counties in the U.S. state of Texas; Mission Bend is  northwest of the city hall of Sugar Land and  southwest of Downtown Houston. The population was 36,914 at the 2020 census.

History
Mission Bend began in the early 1980s. The area gained population between 1980 and 1990. In 1990 the community had 24,945 residents. By 2000 many of the area's residents commuted to Houston.

Geography

Mission Bend is located at  (29.693667, -95.661721).

Demographics

As of the 2020 United States census, there were 36,914 people, 10,864 households, and 8,997 families residing in the CDP.

As of the census of 2000, there were 30,831 people, 8,978 households, and 7,864 families residing in the CDP. The population density was 5,900.1 people per square mile (2,276.1/km2). There were 9,202 housing units at an average density of 1,761.0/sq mi (679.3/km2). The racial makeup of the CDP was 46.32% White, 21.50% African American, 0.31% Native American, 16.96% Asian, 0.08% Pacific Islander, 10.63% from other races, and 4.20% from two or more races. Hispanic or Latino of any race were 27.06% of the population.

There were 8,978 households, out of which 55.7% had children under the age of 18 living with them, 70.5% were married couples living together, 12.5% had a female householder with no husband present, and 12.4% were non-families. 9.5% of all households were made up of individuals, and 1.1% had someone living alone who was 65 years of age or older. The average household size was 3.43 and the average family size was 3.67.

In the CDP, the population was spread out, with 33.7% under the age of 18, 8.1% from 18 to 24, 32.9% from 25 to 44, 21.4% from 45 to 64, and 3.9% who were 65 years of age or older. The median age was 32 years. For every 100 females, there were 97.2 males. For every 100 females age 18 and over, there were 92.2 males.

The median income for a household in the CDP was $60,222, and the median income for a family was $60,999. Males had a median income of $39,323 versus $31,119 for females. The per capita income for the CDP was $20,029. About 4.5% of families and 5.7% of the population were below the poverty line, including 7.5% of those under age 18 and 8.9% of those age 65 or over.

Government and infrastructure
The Harris County Sheriff's Office serves the Harris County side. It operates the Mission Bend Storefront in an unincorporated area in the International District adjacent to the CDP.

Harris Health serves as the hospital district for Harris County. Fort Bend County does not have a hospital district. OakBend Medical Center serves as the county's charity hospital which the county contracts with. Other medical facilities in the area include the 24-hour SignatureCare Emergency Center located on Highway 6 and Beechnut Street.

Education

Primary and secondary schools

Public schools

Mission Bend CDP residents in Fort Bend County are zoned to schools in the Fort Bend Independent School District. Mission Bend CDP residents in Harris County are zoned to schools in the Alief Independent School District. The Fort Bend County section is within the West Division, controlling school board slots 1 through 3. As of 2008 the board members in the slots are Susan Hohnbaum, Sonal Buchar, and Bob Broxson, respectively.

Elementary schools serving the FBISD section of the Mission Bend CDP and within the Mission Bend CDP include Mission Bend, Mission Glen, and Mission West. Arizona Fleming, located in the Four Corners CDP, serves a section of the Mission Bend CDP. Hodges Bend Middle School, located in the Four Corners CDP, serves almost all of the FBISD portion of the CDP, while Crockett Middle School, outside of the Mission Bend CDP, serves a small portion. George Bush High School, located in the Mission Bend CDP, serves the FBISD section of the Mission Bend CDP.

Alief schools that serve Harris County areas in the Mission Bend CDP include Petrosky Elementary School (in the CDP), Miller Intermediate School (outside of the CDP) for non-bilingual and bilingual students, and Albright Middle School (inside the CDP). Elementary school bilingual students are zoned to Rees Elementary School. Alief ISD students are randomly assigned to either Elsik, Hastings, or Taylor high schools. None of the high schools are within the Mission Bend CDP. The district also maintains two magnet schools, Kerr High School and Alief Early College High School.

Private schools
Iman Academy Southwest is currently in the limited purpose Houston city limits. Previously it was in Mission Bend CDP.

Mission Bend Christian Academy is located north of the CDP.

Colleges and universities
The Texas Legislature designated Houston Community College System (HCC) as serving Alief ISD.

Parks and recreation
Fort Bend County owns and operates the Mission West Park in Mission Bend. The park includes a baseball blacktop, a play area, tables, a walking track, and a volleyball court.

Transportation
Metropolitan Transit Authority of Harris County, Texas (METRO) operates public bus services in the area. The agency operates the Mission Bend Park and Ride in an unincorporated area of Harris County, near Mission Bend.

References

External links

 Mission Bend Civic Association
 

Census-designated places in Fort Bend County, Texas
Census-designated places in Harris County, Texas
Census-designated places in Texas
Greater Houston